Anak Betawi Cahaya Wirayudha Football Club (simply known as ABC Wirayudha) is an Indonesian football club based in East Jakarta, Jakarta. They currently competes in Liga 3.

References

External links

East Jakarta
Sport in Jakarta
Football clubs in Indonesia
Football clubs in Jakarta
Association football clubs established in 1978
1978 establishments in Indonesia